Sipanea is a genus of flowering plants belonging to the family Rubiaceae.

Its native range is Trinidad to Central and Southern Tropical America.

Species
Species:

Sipanea ayangannensis 
Sipanea biflora 
Sipanea carrenoi 
Sipanea cowanii 
Sipanea galioides 
Sipanea glaberrima 
Sipanea glabrata 
Sipanea gleasonii 
Sipanea glomerata 
Sipanea hispida 
Sipanea micrantha 
Sipanea ovalifolia 
Sipanea prancei 
Sipanea pratensis 
Sipanea saxicola 
Sipanea setacea 
Sipanea stahelii 
Sipanea veris 
Sipanea wilson-brownei

References

Rubiaceae
Rubiaceae genera